Aaron R. Pierce (born September 8, 1969) is a former professional American football player who played tight end and H-back for seven seasons in the National Football League (NFL) for the New York Giants and the Baltimore Ravens.

Born and raised in Seattle, Washington, Pierce graduated from its Franklin High School and played college football nearby at the University of Washington under head coach Don James.  In his senior season in 1991, the undefeated Huskies shared the national championship with the Miami Hurricanes.  Pierce was selected in the third round of the 1992 NFL Draft by the New York Giants.

References

1969 births
Living people
American football tight ends
Baltimore Ravens players
New York Giants players
Washington Huskies football players
Players of American football from Seattle